Oregocerata zonalis is a species of moth of the family Tortricidae. It is found in Ecuador in the provinces of Loja and Bolivar.

References

Moths described in 2002
Euliini